Stroke is a peer-reviewed medical journal published monthly by Lippincott Williams & Wilkins on behalf of the American Heart Association. It covers research on cerebral circulation and related diseases, including clinical research on assessment of risk for stroke, diagnosis, prevention, and treatment, as well as rehabilitation. All articles become open access after a 12-month embargo. The editor-in-chief was Ralph L. Sacco (University of Miami).

Indexing and abstracting
The journal is indexed and abstracted in the following bibliographic databases:

According to the Journal Citation Reports, the journal has a 2016 impact factor of 6.032, ranking it 16th out of 192 journals in the category "Clinical Neurology" and 5th out of 60 journals in the category "Peripheral Vascular Disease".

References

External links 
 

Cardiology journals
Publications established in 1970
Monthly journals
English-language journals
Lippincott Williams & Wilkins academic journals
Neurology journals
American Heart Association academic journals
Delayed open access journals
Stroke